The South Belfast News is a newspaper based in Belfast, Northern Ireland. It is published by the Belfast Media Group.

External links
South Belfast News

Newspapers published in Northern Ireland
Mass media in Belfast